Rural England: Being an Account of the Agricultural and Social Researches Carried Out in 1901 and 1902 is a non fiction book by H Rider Haggard.

References

External links
Complete Book at Internet Archive

1902 non-fiction books
Works by H. Rider Haggard
Books about England